Gav Mishli (also Romanized as Gāv Mīshlī and Gāv Meshlī; also known as Owbeh-ye Gāv Mīshlī) is a village in Kongor Rural District, in the Central District of Kalaleh County, Golestan Province, Iran. At the 2006 census, its population was 142, in 29 families.

References 

Populated places in Kalaleh County